The Blackshirts are the starting defensive players for the Nebraska Cornhuskers football team.

History
The term dates back to the 1960s, and was inspired by the black jerseys that Nebraska's first-string defenders began to wear during practice. Recent NCAA rule changes permitted two-platoon football teams (different players dedicated to offense and defense), and head coach Bob Devaney ensured the two squads would be visually distinguishable during practice by having the offense and defense wear contrasting colors. Assistant coach Mike Corgan was tasked with obtaining the new jersey pullovers. The sporting goods store he visited reportedly gave him a good deal on black, because the color had not been selling well.  The new jerseys were assigned to be worn by the defense.

The black jerseys immediately helped the coaches quickly identify starting players. The unmarked jerseys were collected each day for laundering and then redistributed during the next practice. After a time, the black jerseys were only given to the defensive players who practiced and performed well. "There probably wasn't a day when we didn't make switches," said George Kelly, Nebraska's defensive line coach from 1960 to 1968.

Long-time sports information director Don Bryant credits much of Blackshirt mystique to Kelly, who was often heard yelling and exhorting the Blackshirts during practices and scrimmages. Eventually, the rest of the coaches began calling the top defensive unit by the same name, and by the time Kelly retired and was succeeded by Monte Kiffin, the "Blackshirts" had become a widely recognized name for Nebraska's defensive starters.

The choice of black to bring about the name "Blackshirts" was not intentional.  Said Kelly in later years, "Honestly, it was an accident of availability".

Use
Blackshirts are awarded to defensive starters and other key defensive players. Punters have also occasionally been honored for their individual efforts when covering punts, including Jesse Kosch and Alex Henery. Besides the black practice jerseys, which today have each player's name and number imprinted on them, the Blackshirts also have a black circle on the back of their helmet. These players will often cross their arms in an "X" across their chests, representing the skull and crossbones, a longtime logo for the Blackshirts. This is called "throwing the bones."  The defensive players not awarded a Blackshirt wear red practice jerseys, while offensive players wear white practice jerseys.

The student section at Memorial Stadium is named the "Boneyard" after the Blackshirts. The Blackshirt logo and the "throwing the bones" motion is often displayed there.

2007 suspension / 2008 reinstatement

On October 16, 2007, the defensive players and coaches made a joint decision to remove the Blackshirts. The first player to remove his Blackshirt was senior captain Zackary Bowman, who felt he wasn't playing up to the standards of the Blackshirt tradition. On November 11, 2008, the Blackshirts were given back to the eleven defensive starters by new head coach Bo Pelini, three days after a win against a strong Kansas team. The win also made the Cornhuskers bowl eligible.

The Blackshirt jersey was temporarily suspended again after Nebraska yielded 271 rushing yards to the Minnesota Golden Gophers in 2013, a game which snapped Minnesota's 16-game losing streak to Nebraska and knocked the #24 Huskers out of the AP and USA Today college football rankings.

Though Blackshirts have been handed out in the interim, no unit has finished in the top 25 annually in defense since.

References

Nebraska Cornhuskers football